Ádám Balajti (born 7 March 1991) is a Hungarian professional footballer who plays for Vasas II.

Career statistics

Honours
 FIFA U-20 World Cup:
Third place: 2009

References

External links
 

1991 births
Sportspeople from Eger
Living people
Hungarian footballers
Hungary youth international footballers
Hungary under-21 international footballers
Association football forwards
Diósgyőri VTK players
Debreceni VSC players
Újpest FC players
MTK Budapest FC players
Mezőkövesdi SE footballers
Szolnoki MÁV FC footballers
Vác FC players
Vasas SC players
Tiszakécske FC footballers
Nemzeti Bajnokság I players
Nemzeti Bajnokság II players
Nemzeti Bajnokság III players